The 175th (2/3rd London) Brigade was an infantry brigade formation of the Territorial Force of the British Army. The brigade was formed as a 2nd Line of the 169th (1/3rd London) Brigade and was assigned to the 58th (2/1st London) Division, itself formed as a 2nd Line of 56th (1/1st London) Division, and served on the Western Front during the First World War.

Formation
 2/9th (County of London) Battalion, London Regiment
 2/10th (County of London) Battalion, London Regiment
 2/11th (County of London) Battalion, London Regiment
 2/12th (County of London) Battalion, London Regiment
 44th Machine Gun Company, Machine Gun Corps
 215th Machine Gun Company, Machine Gun Corps
 175th Trench Mortar Battery

References

Infantry brigades of the British Army in World War I
Military units and formations in London